Kaitlyn Bernard (born November 28, 2000) is a Canadian actress best known for her roles in films such as 1922 (2017), Spontaneous (2020), and The Professor (2018).

Early life
Bernard was born on November 28, 2000 in Vancouver, British Columbia.

Filmography

Film

Television

References

External links

Living people
Canadian film actresses
Canadian television actresses
21st-century Canadian actresses
2000 births